Ducetia is the type genus of the Ducetiini: a tribe of Asian bush crickets (subfamily Phaneropterinae).

Species
The Catalogue of Life lists:

Ducetia attenuata Xia & Liu, 1990
Ducetia biramosa Karsch, 1889
Ducetia boninensis Ishikawa, 1987
Ducetia borealis Gorochov & Kang, 2002
Ducetia ceylanica Brunner von Wattenwyl, 1878
Ducetia chelocerca Ragge, 1961
Ducetia costata Ragge, 1961
Ducetia crosskeyi Ragge, 1961
Ducetia crypteria Karsch, 1896
Ducetia dichotoma Ingrisch & Shishodia, 1998
Ducetia furcata Ragge, 1961
Ducetia fuscopunctata Chopard, 1954
species group Ducetia japonica (Thunberg, 1815)
 Ducetia adspersa Brunner von Wattenwyl, 1878
 Ducetia aliena (Walker, 1869)
 Ducetia antipoda Rentz & Heller, 2017
 Ducetia japonica (Thunberg, 1815) - type species (as "Locusta japonica" Thunberg)
 Ducetia lanceolata (Walker, 1859)
 Ducetia malayana Heller, 2017
 Ducetia melodica Heller & Ingrisch, 2017
 Ducetia neochlora (Walker, 1869)
Ducetia strelkovi Gorochov & Storozhenko, 1993
Ducetia javanica Brunner von Wattenwyl, 1891
Ducetia levatiala Ragge, 1980
Ducetia loosi Griffini, 1908
Ducetia macrocerca Ragge, 1961
Ducetia parva Ragge, 1961
Ducetia punctata Schulthess Schindler, 1898
Ducetia punctipennis Gerstaecker, 1869
Ducetia ramulosa Ragge, 1961
Ducetia ruspolii Schulthess Schindler, 1898
Ducetia sagitta Ragge, 1961
Ducetia serrata Nagar, Swaminathan & Mal, 2015
Ducetia spatula Ragge, 1961
Ducetia spina Chang, Lu & Shi, 2003
Ducetia triramosa Ingrisch, 1990
Ducetia unzenensis Yamasaki, 1983
Ducetia vitriala Ragge, 1961
Ducetia zagulajevi Gorochov, 2001
Ducetia zhengi Chang & Shi, 1999

Gallery

References

External links

Phaneropterinae
Tettigoniidae genera
Orthoptera of Indo-China